Taksim is an underground rapid transit complex. It is located in central Beyoğlu under Taksim Square in Istanbul. The complex is serviced by the M2 line of the Istanbul Metro and the Kabataş-Taksim Funicular (F1) line. Taksim was opened on 16 September 2000 as the southern terminus of the M2 until the line was extended to Yenikapı in 2014. On 29 June 2006 the Kabataş-Taksim funicular station was opened, offering shuttle service to Kabataş. Taksim is the busiest station on the M2 Line as well as the Istanbul Metro. Connections to Havabüs express bus service to Sabiha Gökçen Airport are available.

2013 Gezi Park protests

In the beginning of June 2013, during the height of the Gezi Park protests, Taksim square was the scene of large clashes between police and protesters. Due to the use of overwhelming force and tear gas, many protesters sought refuge in nearby hotels as well as Taksim station. Police however followed protesters into the station and fired tear gas grenades into the underground complex further harming the protesters as well as tourists and other civilians on the platforms below. Due to these clashes M2 service was suspended until the tear gas was cleared from the complex.

Layout

Nearby places of interest
Taksim Square
Republic Monument
Gezi Park
Atatürk Cultural Center

References

Beyoğlu
Istanbul metro stations
Railway stations opened in 2000
2000 establishments in Turkey